The list of shipwrecks in 1899 includes ships sunk, foundered, grounded, or otherwise lost during 1899.

January

1 January

5 January

6 January

9 January

12 January

13 January

14 January

16 January

17 January

19 January

22 January

24 January

25 January

26 January

29 January

31 January

Unknown date

February

4 February

8 February

9 February

10 February

12 February

13 February

14 February

15 February

18 February

21 February

22 February

23 February

24 February

25 February

27 February

Unknown date

March

1 March

4 March

5 March

7 March

12 March

16 March

16 March

21 March

26 March

28 March

29 March

30 March

April

1 April

4 April

6 April

7 April

8 April

9 April

10 April

16 April

18 April

21 April

23 April

24 April

25 April

27 April

29 April

Unknown date

May

1 May

3 May

4 May

5 May

7 May

11 May

13 May

14 May

16 May

18 May

21 May

 She was eventually refloated on 11 July, repaired, and returned to service as Philadelphia.

22 May

25 May

26 May

June

1 June

2 June

4 June

5 June

10 June

12 June

13 June

15 June

17 June

22 June

23 June

25 June

26 June

28 June

30 June

July

2 July

4 July

5 July

7 July

10 July

11 July

12 July

16 July

16 July

18 July

19 July

21 July

22 July

25 July

26 July

27 July

29 July

30 July

31 July

Unknown date

August

1 August

2 August

4 August

5 August

6 August

7 August

11 August

12 August

13 August

15 August

16 August

17 August

18 August

19 August

20 August

21 August

22 August

24 August

25 August

26 August

29 August

30 August

Unknown date

September

2 September

3 September

4 September

5 September

7 September

8 September

10 September

11 September

12 September

16 September

17 September

19 September

21 September

22 September

24 September

25 September

26 September

27 September

28 September

29 September

30 September

October

1 October

3 October

5 October

8 October

9 October

12 October

13 October

14 October

17 October

18 October

20 October

22 October

25 October

28 October

29 October

30 October

31 October

Unknown date

November

1 November

2 November

4 November

5 November

6 November

8 November

10 November

11 November

12 November

13 November

20 November

21 November

25 November

26 November

27 November

29 November

30 November

December

1 December

2 December

3 December

7 December

8 December

12 December

13 December

14 December

18 December

23 December

24 December

26 December

27 December

29 December

30 December

31 December

Unknown date

Unknown date

References
 
 
 
 
 

1899